Carl Rose may refer to:

Carl Rose (cartoonist) (1903–1971), cartoonist for The New Yorker
Carl Rose (soccer) (born 1952), Canadian soccer player who played at the 1976 Olympics

See also
Karl Rose (disambiguation)
Charlie Rose (disambiguation)
Rose (disambiguation)